Astrocalyx is a genus of flowering plants belonging to the family Melastomataceae.

Its native range is Philippines.

Species:

Astrocalyx calycina

References

Melastomataceae
Melastomataceae genera